William H. Bassichis is an American physicist. He has been a physics professor  at Texas A&M University since 1970.  He is the author of a series of undergraduate physics textbooks titled Don't Panic, which is used by  some universities across North America. Before teaching at Texas A&M, Bassichis has done research at the Weizmann Institute of Science, the Centre d'études Nucléaires de Saclay, and the Lawrence Livermore Laboratory. He has also taught at MIT.

Education
Bassichis graduated from the Massachusetts Institute of Technology in 1959. He received his master's  and his Ph.D. from Case Institute of Technology, in 1961 and 1963, respectively.

Awards
Bassichis has been awarded the university-wide Faculty Distinguished Achievement Award for Teaching and two College of Science Faculty Distinguished Achievement Awards for Teaching, both awarded by The Association of Former Students.
On April 25, 2003, he named Presidential Professor for Teaching Excellence, a rank which was created by former university president Robert Gates.

Research

Dr. Bassichis's research interests include nuclear theory with emphasis on many-body theory and the prediction of the properties of nuclei in terms of constituent interactions, nucleus-nucleus scattering theory, solar energy studies using flat plate collectors and the advantages of a vacuum environment.

Professor Bassichis has published 51 peer-reviewed articles in the field of theoretical atomic physics.  
The five most cited ones are: 
 (Times Cited: 124) 
 (Times Cited: 109) 
 (Times Cited: 77) 
 (Times Cited: 42) 
 (Times Cited: 32)

External links
William H. Bassichis Classpage
William H. Bassichis at Texas A&M Department of Physics

References

21st-century American physicists
American nuclear physicists
Massachusetts Institute of Technology alumni
Case Western Reserve University alumni
Living people
Year of birth missing (living people)